Svalbard is an archipelago in the Arctic Ocean roughly centered on
78° north latitude and 20° east longitude. The archipelago is the northernmost part of the Kingdom of Norway.  The three main islands in the group consist of Spitsbergen (the largest island), Nordaustlandet and Edgeøya.  There are also a number of smaller islands, such as Barents Island (Barentsøya), Kvitøya, Prins Karls Forland (English: Prince Charles Foreland), Kongsøya, Bear Island, Svenskøya, Wilhelm Island and other smaller islands or skerries.

Climate

There is no arable land in the island group due to heavy glaciation and the northern latitude.  There are no trees native to the archipelago, but there are shrubs such as crowberry and cloudberry.  The west coast of Spitsbergen remains navigable most of the year, due to favorable winds which keep the area ice-free.  Norway claims a  fishery protection zone, but this is not recognized by neighboring Russia.

The climate of the Svalbard archipelago is arctic, tempered by warm North Atlantic Current along the west and northern coasts.  This means cool summers and cold winters along the wild, rugged mountainous islands.  The high land of the island interiors is generally ice covered year round, with the west coast clear of ice about one half of the year.  There are many  fjords along west and north coasts

Resources
Svalbard has many mineral resources, and coal was mined extensively on the west side of Spitsbergen.  Ice floes often block up the entrance to Bellsund (a transit point for coal exports) on the west coast and occasionally make parts of the northeastern coast inaccessible to maritime traffic

Environmental issues
Although many prior adverse practises are now banned, the issues surrounding past exploitation of animal resources in the Svalbard area remain a problem. With whale, seal and walrus populations are still far below than they were even two centuries ago (the average age of a Greenland whale). The population of polar bears are locally recovering from the major culls of the 1960s and 1970s that came about due to the availability of snow scooters; however, the polar bear remains threatened at a global level, due to unsustainable levels of killing by humans and marine water pollution. There are a wide variety of birds in Svalbard including puffin, Arctic skua, kittiwake and fulmar, many of which populations are being monitored.

Physical geography

Lands

The main islands of Svalbard is parted into several lands:
Spitsbergen:
Albert I Land
Haakon VII Land
Andrée Land
Prins Karls Forland
Oscar II Land
James I Land
Dickson Land
Ny-Friesland
Olav V Land
Bünsow Land
Sabine Land
Nordenskiöld Land
Heer Land
Nathorst Land
Wedel Jarlsberg Land
Torell Land
Sørkapp Land
Nordaustlandet
Gustav V Land
Prins Oscars Land
Orvin Land
Gustav Adolf Land

Fjords
There are numerous fjords among the Svalbard islands; the five longest of which (measured from the head to open sea) are listed here:
 Wijdefjorden, 
 Isfjorden, 
 Van Mijenfjorden, 
 Woodfjorden, 
 Wahlenbergfjord,

Coastlines

Coastlines of the Svalbard islands (listed from largest island to smallest) show the extensive variability characteristic of glacial formation:
 Spitsbergen, 
 Nordaustlandet, 
 Edgeøya, 
 Barentsøya, 
 Kvitøya, 
 Prins Karls Forland, 
 Kongsøya, 
 Bear Island (Bjørnøya), 
 Hopen, >
 Svenskøya, 
 Wilhelm Island, 
 Other smaller islands and skerries,

Mountains
Although they are small when compared with the mountains of Norway, the elevation of the Svalbard island mountains accounts for much of the glacial erosion:

 Newtontoppen, 
 Perriertoppen, 
 Ceresfjellet, 
 Chadwickryggen, 
 Galileotoppen,

Glaciers

 Austfonna (with Sørfonna and Vegafonna), 
 Olav V Land, 
 Vestfonna, 
 Åsgårdfonna, 
 Edgeøyjøkulen, 
 Hinlopenbreen, 
 Negribreen, 
 Bråsvellbreen, 
 Etonbreen, 
 Leighbreen, 
 Holtedahlfonna (with Isachsenfonna), 
 Kvitøyjøkulen (Kvitøya (island)), 
 Stonebreen, 
 Kronebreen, 
 Hochstetterbreen, 
 Barentsjøkulen, 
 Balderfonna, 
 Nathorstbreen, 
 Monacobreen,

Rivers 

 Agardhelva
Bungeelva
 Grøndalselva
 Lidelva
 Longyear River
 Reindalselva
 Sassenelva
 Semmeldalselva
 Slaklielva
 Vinda

Settlements

Inhabited 
Barentsburg (Баренцбург) (Russian settlement — population of 400)
Bear Island (Norwegian weather station, population of 9)
Hopen (Norwegian weather station, population of 4)
Hornsund (Polish research station, population of 8)
Longyearbyen (population of ≈2,000)
Ny-Ålesund (population of 40)
Sveagruva (population of 310, none living permanently)

No roads link the settlements on the island; transportation includes boat, airplane, helicopter, and snowmobile. The gateway to Svalbard is Svalbard Airport, Longyearbyen.

Former
Harlingen kokerij (Dutch settlement established in 1636 in Houcker Bay, abandoned sometime after 1662)
Kobbefjorden (also Robbe Bay or Copenhagen Bay) (Danish settlement established in 1631, abandoned in 1658)
Engelskbukta (English settlement established around 1615, occupied until mid-century)
Gravneset (English settlement established in the early 17th century, abandoned between 1624 and 1632, after which time it was appropriated by the Dutch)
Grumant (Grumantbyen) (Грумант) (Russian settlement, abandoned in 1961, revival of mining operations announced in 2003)
Gåshamna (Two English settlements, established sometime around 1618 and occupied until at least 1655)
Lægerneset (Dutch settlement appropriated by the English in 1615, occupied by the latter until the 1650s)
Port Louis (French settlement established in 1633, abandoned in 1637)
Pyramiden (Пирамида) (Russian settlement, abandoned in 1998)
Smeerenburg (Danish-Dutch settlement established in 1619 on the southeastern promontory of Amsterdam Island, abandoned around 1660)
Ytre Norskøya (Dutch settlement possibly rivaling Smeerenburg in size; probably established by members of the Zeeland chamber in the 1620s or later, and abandoned in 1670)

Line notes

References
 Walter Brian Harland, Lester M. Anderson, Daoud Manasrah, Nicholas J. Butterfield. 1997. The geology of Svalbard
 C. Michael Hogan. 2008. Polar Bear: Ursus maritimus, Globaltwitcher.com, ed. Nicklas Stromberg

External links
Geology of Svalbard
Database of place names at the Norwegian Polar Institute